Dylan Caton is an Australian football (soccer) player who played as a midfielder for Sydney FC in the A-League. He debuted against Western Sydney Wanderers on January 11, 2014, coming on for Alessandro Del Piero.

References

External links
 

1995 births
Australian soccer players
Sydney FC players
A-League Men players
National Premier Leagues players
Association football midfielders
Living people